This is the discography of Cantopop artist Miriam Yeung.

Studio albums

Compilation albums

Live albums

Extended plays

Pop music discographies
Yeung, Miriam